Chahe is a town in Fengnan District, Tangshan, Hebei. , it administers the following 26 villages:
Chahe First Village
Chahe Second Village
Yangyikoutou First Village
Yangyikoutou Second Village
Yangyikoutou Third Village
Meyizhuang Village
Songjiakoutou Village
Liuzhuangzi Village
Puzhuangzi Village
Gaotuo Village
Xiaodaodi Village
Zhangfuzhuang Village
Zhuxinzhuang Village
Sunzhuangzi Village
Dongzhuangzi Village
Zhaojiakoutou Village
Cuizhuangzi Village
Wanggezhuang First Village
Wanggezhuang Second Village
Wanggezhuang Third Village
Wanggezhuang Fourth Village
Sanshenzhuang Village
Sishenzhuang First Village
Sishenzhuang Second Village
Daronggezhuang Village
Xiaoronggezhuang Village

References

Tangshan
Township-level divisions of Hebei